Siuraq (Inuktitut syllabics: ᓯᐅᕋᖅ) formerly Tern Island is an island located in Nunavut's Qikiqtaaluk Region in the northern Canadian Arctic. It is situated in the Foxe Basin. The mainland's Melville Peninsula is to the west, Baffin Island is to the northwest, and Kapuiviit is to the northeast.

References

Islands of Foxe Basin
Uninhabited islands of Qikiqtaaluk Region